The title of Duke of Montagu has been created twice, firstly for the  Montagu family of Boughton, Northamptonshire, and secondly for the Brudenell family, Earls of Cardigan. It was first created in the Peerage of England in 1705 for Ralph Montagu, 3rd Baron Montagu of Boughton, with the subsidiary title Marquess of Monthermer, but became extinct in 1749. The 1st Duke had been created Earl of Montagu and Viscount Monthermer in 1689.  The Dukedom was then recreated in the Peerage of Great Britain in 1766 (together with the subsidiary title Marquess of Monthermer) for the late Duke's son-in-law George Brudenell, 4th Earl of Cardigan, who adopted the surname of Montagu. On his death in 1790 the dukedom and marquessate became extinct a second time, but the earldom passed to his brother, James Brudenell, 5th Earl of Cardigan.

The dukedom is named after the Montagu family "of Boughton" in Northamptonshire, where the 1st Duke built the splendid and surviving Boughton House, which claimed descent from the ancient Anglo-Norman family of Montagu, Earls of Salisbury, which connection is however unproven. The earliest proven ancestor of the Montagu family of Boughton is Thomas Montagu (d.1516) of Hemington, Northamptonshire, the son of Richard Ladde (d.1484), "alias Montagu", of Hanging Houghton in Northamptonshire, whose family of Ladde is recorded in the deeds of that place from 1355. Richard Ladde "alias Montagu" was the father of Sir Edward Montagu, Lord Chief Justice (great-great grandfather of the 1st Duke), who purchased the estate of Boughton in 1528. It is suggested by the Complete Peerage that the Ladde family adopted the surname of Montagu due to "having to deal with some Montagu inheritance", i.e. dictated by the terms of a bequest from a member of that family, as was common practice, requiring the legatee to adopt the surname and arms of the legator, where a branch of a family had died out in the male line. Collins Peerage suggests that the Montagu family of Boughton was descended from James "Montagu", a natural son of Thomas Montagu, 4th Earl of Salisbury (1388-1428), the maternal grandfather of "Warwick the King-Maker", 16th Earl of Warwick, 6th Earl of Salisbury. The Montagu family of Boughton and its descendants use the coat of arms of Montagu, Earls of Salisbury, but differenced by a bordure sable, and quarters the arms of Monthermer, as did the Earls of Salisbury, but undifferenced.

Sir Edward Montagu of Boughton, Lord Chief Justice, was the ancestor of Montagu, Duke of Montagu, Montagu, Earls and Dukes of Manchester, Montagu, Earls of Sandwich and Montagu, Earls of Halifax.

Earls of Montagu (1689)
Other titles: Baron Montagu of Boughton (1621)
Ralph Montagu, 3rd Baron Montagu of Boughton, 1st Earl of Montagu (1638–c. 1709) (created Duke of Montagu in 1705)

Dukes of Montagu, first Creation (1705)
Other titles: Earl of Montagu (1689) and Baron Montagu of Boughton (1621)
Ralph Montagu, 1st Duke of Montagu (1638–c. 1709) was a courtier and diplomat
John Montagu, 2nd Duke of Montagu (1690–1749), only son of the 1st Duke, died without male issue

Dukes of Montagu, second Creation (1766)
Other titles: Marquess of Monthermer (1766), Earl of Cardigan (1661), Baron Brudenell of Stonton, in the county of Leicester (1628) and Baron Montagu of Boughton, in the county Northampton (1786)
George Montagu, 1st Duke of Montagu (1712–1790), son-in-law of the 2nd Duke
John Montagu, Marquess of Monthermer (1735–1770), only son of the 1st Duke, predeceased his father unmarried

Family tree

References

Extinct dukedoms in the Peerage of England
Extinct dukedoms in the Peerage of Great Britain
Duke
Duke
1689 establishments in England
1705 establishments in England
1766 establishments in Great Britain
Noble titles created in 1705
Noble titles created in 1766